Edwin Ernest Rich (born Bristol 4 August 1904; died: Heydon  7 July 1979) was a 20th-century historian.

Education 
Rich was educated at Colston's School and Selwyn College, Cambridge. He was fellow of St Catharine's College, Cambridge, from 1930 to 1957; Proctor of Cambridge University in 1939; Vere Harmsworth Professor of Imperial and Naval History from 1951 to 1970; and Master of St Catharine's College, Cambridge from 1957 to 1973.

External links
 McGill University: E. E. Rich (1964). Lectures - Montreal and the Fur Trade.

References

Writers from Bristol
People educated at Colston's School
Alumni of Selwyn College, Cambridge
20th-century English educators
Fellows of St Catharine's College, Cambridge
Masters of St Catharine's College, Cambridge
Vere Harmsworth Professors of Imperial and Naval History
1904 births
1979 deaths